Josef Felder (24 August 1900 – 28 October 2000) was a German politician. He was one of the 94 Social Democratic members of the Reichstag who voted against the Nazi Enabling Act of 1933. He was also the last to die of the 94 who voted against this act.

He participated in the famous The Nazis: A Warning From History television series which was produced and broadcast by the BBC. His sections during the series included his experience as a prisoner of Nazi's political opponents in Dachau, where he himself was sent.

References

1900 births
2000 deaths
German centenarians
Men centenarians
Politicians from Augsburg
People from the Kingdom of Bavaria
Grand Crosses with Star and Sash of the Order of Merit of the Federal Republic of Germany
Members of the Reichstag of the Weimar Republic
Members of the Bundestag for Bavaria
Dachau concentration camp survivors
Members of the Bundestag for the Social Democratic Party of Germany
Vorwärts editors